Peter Paul Reckell (born May 7, 1955) is an American actor.  He is best known for playing Bo Brady,  a role he originated in 1983 on the NBC drama Days of Our Lives.

Reckell has played Bo Brady on Days of Our Lives from 1983 to 1987, 1990 to 1992, 1995 to 2012, and returned (with others) in fall 2015 as a lead up to the 50th anniversary (November 8, 1965) of the show. Other notable credits include Eric Hollister on As the World Turns (1980–1982) and Johnny Rourke on Knots Landing (1988–1989).

Early years
Reckell was born in Elkhart, Indiana, but grew up on a farm in Okemos, Michigan. The second oldest of six children, he has two brothers and three sisters. While in junior high school, Reckell built theater sets and performed in the chorus, and eventually became a theater technical director. He went on to appear in numerous plays throughout high school.
Upon graduation, Reckell attended the prestigious Boston Conservatory, where he received a Bachelor of Fine Arts degree in theater with a minor in music and dance.

Career
Reckell made his network-television debut as Eric Hollister on As the World Turns. He then played Bo on Days of our Lives from 1983 to 1987 and later from 1990 to 1992. He returned to the role of the rugged cop for the third time in August 1995, but departed the role again in October 2012. During part of his absence from Days, Reckell appeared in the recurring role of Johnny Rourke on the primetime series Knots Landing. Among Reckell's stage credits are Moonchildren, The Fantasticks, The Pirates of Penzance, Jesus Christ Superstar, Guys and Dolls, Love Letters and Deathtrap.

His feature film credits include Rustam Ibraguimbekov's Broken Bridges, which was filmed in Russia.

On May 14, 2009, twenty-six years since his debut on Days of Our Lives, Reckell was nominated for his first Daytime Emmy Award for Outstanding Lead Actor in a Drama Series.

In 2010, Reckell joined the cast of the Emmy Award-winning web soap series Venice: The Series as Richard McAndrews.  This venture soon became a family affair with wife Kelly Moneymaker coming on board in 2011 to coordinate music for the highly anticipated third season of the show.

Personal life
Reckell married Dale Kristien in December 1987. They divorced in 1991.

Reckell married Kelly Moneymaker on April 18, 1998. Their daughter, Loden Sloan, was born on October 25, 2007. They now reside in Alaska.
Reckell enjoys practicing yoga, martial arts, swimming, horseback riding and mountain biking.

Filmography

Awards and nominations
Daytime Emmy Awards
2009: Nominated, "Outstanding Lead Actor in a Drama Series" - Days of our Lives

Soap Opera Digest Awards
1984: Won, "Outstanding Actor in a Daytime Soap Opera" - Days of our Lives
1985: Won, "Outstanding Actor in a Daytime Soap Opera" - Days of our Lives
1986: Nominated, "Favorite Daytime Super Couple on a Daytime Serial" - Days of our Lives (shared w/Kristian Alfonso)
1986: Won, "Outstanding Young Leading Actor in a Daytime Serial" - Days of our Lives
1996: Won, "Hottest Male Star" - Days of our Lives
2001: Won, "Favorite Couple" - Days of our Lives (shared w/Kristian Alfonso)

Other
2002: Won, "America's Favorite Couple" - Days of our Lives (shared w/Kristian Alfonso)
2005: Nominated, "Irresistible Combination" - Days of our Lives (shared w/Kristian Alfonso)

Discography

See also
Days of Our Lives
Bo Brady and Hope Williams
Supercouple

References

External links
 
 Venice The Series

1955 births
Living people
American male soap opera actors
Boston Conservatory at Berklee alumni
Male actors from Indiana
People from Elkhart, Indiana